Luigi Martinelli (born September 2, 1970 in Chiari) is an Italian footballer who plays for Serie C1 team Hellas Verona in the role of defender.

External links
 Luigi's profile from Gazzetta dello Sport

1970 births
Living people
Italian footballers
U.S. Fiorenzuola 1922 S.S. players
A.C. ChievoVerona players
A.C.N. Siena 1904 players
Ascoli Calcio 1898 F.C. players
Torino F.C. players
Hellas Verona F.C. players
Association football defenders
Serie A players
Virtus Bergamo Alzano Seriate 1909 players